Events in the year 1837 in Portugal.

Incumbents
Monarch: Mary II
Prime Minister: Bernardo de Sá Nogueira de Figueiredo, 1st Marquis of Sá da Bandeira

Events

Arts and entertainment

Sports

Births

16 September – Pedro V of Portugal, king (died 1861)
30 November – José Dias Ferreira, lawyer and politician (died 1909)

Deaths

Domingos Sequeira, painter (b. 1768).

References

 
1830s in Portugal
Portugal
Years of the 19th century in Portugal
Portugal